John Harold Hare (June 8, 1920 – March 23, 2009) was Canadian politician, agrologist and professor.

Political career
Hare was the Progressive Conservative Member of Parliament for the Winnipeg-area riding of St. Boniface for one year. He was elected in a 1978 by-election in what was considered a safe Liberal seat after being defeated in the 1974 federal election by Revenue minister Joseph Guay. Hare won, in part by capitalizing on the dislike of Trudeau by anglophone voters in a riding that has a significant francophone population and claimed that French Canadians followed instructions from their parish priests on how to vote. Hare's victory was the first time the Tories won the riding since the 1958 election landslide by John Diefenbaker's Conservatives. The by-election (one of 15 held on the same day across the country) was seen as a litmus test for the Liberal government of Pierre Trudeau.

Nevertheless, Hare was defeated in the 1979 federal election despite the defeat of Trudeau's government by Joe Clark's Progressive Conservatives. Joe Borowski, co-ordinator of the anti-abortion group Campaign Life claimed that his group's work was the main reason for Hare's defeat. He died in Winnipeg in 2009.

References

External links
 

1920 births
2009 deaths
Progressive Conservative Party of Canada MPs
Members of the House of Commons of Canada from Manitoba